Silinskaya-1 is a rural locality (a village) in Morozovskoye Rural Settlement, Verkhovazhsky District, Vologda Oblast, Russia. The population was 103 as of 2002. There are 2 streets.

Geography 
Silinskaya-1 is located 25 km northwest of Verkhovazhye (the district's administrative centre) by road. Morozovo is the nearest rural locality.

References 

Rural localities in Verkhovazhsky District